R. Prabhu (born 31 May 1947) was an Indian National Congress member of Parliament in India, representing the Nilgiris (Ooty) constituency of Tamil Nadu, India. He was elected from Nilgiris five times since 1980 and one time Union Minister in Rajiv Gandhi cabinet.

Family
R. Prabhu was born on 31 May 1947 to Coimbatore based educationalist and industrialist P. R. Ramakrishnan and R. Rajeshwari. His father P. R. Ramakrishnan was the first Indian Alumni of MIT Sloan School of Management and a graduate of Massachusetts Institute of Technology, United States who founded Madras Aluminum Company, South India Viscose, Coimbatore Institute of Technology and many other textile industries and two time Member of Parliament representing Indian National Congress from Coimbatore for the 3rd Lok Sabha during the  1962 General Elections  and Pollachi for the 2nd Lok Sabha during the  1957 General Elections. He is also the grandson of industrialist and Indian Civil Service officer Velagapudi Ramakrishna, who founded the KCP group of Industries in Chennai on the maternal side.

Education
R. Prabhu completed his graduation in mechanical engineering from Madras University with honours and was a university gold medalist. He later completed his Master of Science from Massachusetts Institute of Technology.

Political career
He was a five-term Member of Parliament, representing the Nilgiris (Ooty) constituency of Tamil Nadu, India. He also held several ministerial posts and membership in parliamentary committees and ministries.

References

Links
 Official Website 

Living people
Indian Tamil people
Lok Sabha members from Tamil Nadu
1947 births
India MPs 2004–2009
Indian National Congress politicians from Tamil Nadu
People from Ooty
India MPs 1980–1984
India MPs 1984–1989
India MPs 1989–1991
India MPs 1991–1996
United Progressive Alliance candidates in the 2014 Indian general election
People from Nilgiris district
Politicians from Coimbatore
Tamil Nadu politicians